The Carta dominica is an apocryphal text of the New Testament. Although it was widely copied as a kind of chain letter, and hence details change between individual manuscripts, the text largely purports to be a letter written by Jesus emphasising the importance of Sunday as the day of Sabbath for Christians. It was written before 600 CE, but a more specific date – like the text's original language – is not known.

Description and contents 
The Carta dominica is an apocryphal text for the New Testament that has been widely copied and translated into several languages and scripts, including Syriac, the Garšūnī script for Arabic, and Geʽez. The original language of the text is unknown, but it may have been written in Greek. It was written before 600 CE (a bishop in Spain condemned the text around 584), though a more precise date is not known. All variants of the text descend from one original, which has not been preserved. It has circulated widely due to its chain letter-like qualities; the letter requests its readers to circulate the text and always possess a copy. If they do not, the letter claims, they will face various challenges in their lives. Use of the text was challenged as heretical by a Lateran Council in the mid-700s, and it was condemned in Charlemagne's Admonitio generalis in 789. There is evidence of its circulation within England during the Middle Ages.

Various forms of the letter circulated in modern times. Voltaire reproduced a booklet, printed in Bourges in 1771, giving a version which purportedly descended from the sky at Paimpol. The distribution of variants of the Letter persisted in France until around 1852, when book peddling disappeared. Father Hippolyte Delehaye, president of the Bollandist Society, saw in the words attributed to Our Lady of La Salette an avatar of the Letter of Jesus Christ on Sunday.

The text is one of very few that claim direct authorship from Jesus, albeit post-resurrection. Its wide circulation has led to several variants in the text, but (sometimes after an introduction) it largely recounts the role of Jesus in forming Adam, him giving spiritual commandments to Moses, the text being found or delivered after Jesus's resurrection, and the importance of Sunday as the Sabbath. The Sunday teachings are especially prominent in the text, and Jesus warns readers of mortal and spiritual dangers for not respecting the Sabbath (e.g., being burned alive and facing negative judgment by God), and promises rewards to those who do (positive judgment).

Notes and references

Notes

Citations

Works cited

Further reading 

 A. Vassiliev, Anecdota graeco-byzantina, 1, Moscou, 1893, p. XIV-XX and 23–32.
 H. Delehaye, « Note sur la légende de la lettre du Christ tombée du ciel », Bulletin de l'Académie royale de Belgique, Classe de lettres, 1899, pp. 171–213. Reprinted in H. Delehaye, Mélanges d'hagiographie grecque et latine, Brussels, 1966, p. 150-178.
 M. Bittner, "Der vom Himmel gefallen Brief in seinen morgenländischen Versionen und Rezensionen", Denkschriften der kaiserlichen Akademie der Wissenschaften : philosophisch-historische Klasse, 51, 1, Vienna, 1906, p. 1-240.
 R. Stübe, Der Himmelsbrief. Ein Beitrag zur allgemeinen Religionsgeschichte, Tübingen, 1918.
 H. Delehaye, « Un exemplaire de la lettre tombée du ciel », dans Recherches de Science Religieuse, 18 (1928), p. 164-169 (Mélanges Grandmaison).
 Robert E. McNally, "Dies Dominica : Two Hiberno-Latin Texts", in Mediaevalia, vol. 22, 1960, p. 355-361. (First page online.)
 A. de Santos Otero, Los Evangelios apócrifos, Madrid, 1963, p. 670-682.
 M. Erbetta, Gli Apocrifi del Nuovo Testamento, 3, Turin, 1969, p. 113-118.
 Jean Stern, La Salette, Documents authentiques, t. 1, Desclée De Brouwer, 1980, p. 375-392. (Discusses the opinion of Delehaye 1928 on the relationship between the Letter of Jesus Christ and the La Salette apparition. Provides bibliographical additions to Delehaye 1899.)
 M. van Esbroeck, "La Lettre sur le dimanche descendue du ciel", Analecta Bollandiana, 107, 1989, pp. 267–284.
 Irena Backus, Introduction to the French translation of a Greek and a Latin version of the Letter, in Écrits apocryphes chrétiens, t. 2, Gallimard, Bibliothèque de la Pléiade, 2006, p. 1101-1106.
 Martyn Lyons, "Celestial letters: morals and magic in nineteenth-century France", French History, Volume 27, Issue 4, December 2013, pages 496–514, online.

New Testament apocrypha
Sunday
6th-century Christian texts